Asura chrypsilon is a moth of the family Erebidae. It is found on the Philippines.

References

chrypsilon
Moths described in 1899
Moths of the Philippines
Taxa named by Georg Semper
Fauna of Luzon